In enzymology, a catechol oxidase (dimerizing) is an enzyme that catalyzes the chemical reaction

4 catechol + 3 O2  2 dibenzo[1,4]dioxin-2,3-dione + 6 H2O

Thus, the two substrates of this enzyme are catechol and O2, whereas its two products are [[dibenzo[1,4]dioxin-2,3-dione]] and H2O.

This enzyme belongs to the family of oxidoreductases, specifically those acting on the CH-OH group of donor with oxygen as acceptor.  The systematic name of this enzyme class is catechol:oxygen oxidoreductase (dimerizing).

References 

 

EC 1.1.3
Enzymes of unknown structure